The Qattara Depression Project, or Qattara Project for short, is a macro-engineering project concept in Egypt. Rivalling the Aswan High Dam in scope, the intention is to develop the hydroelectric potential of the Qattara Depression by creating an artificial lake.

Location
The Qattara depression is a region that lies 60 m below sea level on average and is currently a vast, uninhabited desert. By connecting the region and the Mediterranean Sea with tunnels and/or canals, water could be let into the area. The inflowing water would then evaporate quickly because of the desert climate. This way a continuous flow of water could be created if inflow and evaporation were balanced out. With this continuously flowing water, hydroelectricity could be generated. Eventually, this would result in a hypersaline lake or a salt pan as the water evaporates and leaves the salt it contains behind. This would return the Qattara Depression to its current state but with its sabkha soils tens of meters higher.

Construction proposals
The proposals call for a large canal or tunnel being excavated of about  depending on the route chosen to the Mediterranean Sea to bring seawater into the area. Or otherwise a 320 kilometre (200 mile) pipeline north-east to the freshwater Nile River south of Rosetta. In comparison, Egypt's Suez Canal is currently 193 kilometres in length. By balancing the inflow and evaporation, the lake's water level can be held constant. Several proposed lake levels are 70, 60 and 50 meters below sea level.

History
The first documented person to suggest flooding large parts of the Sahara desert was French geographer François Élie Roudaire whose proposal inspired the writer Jules Verne's final book Invasion of the Sea. Plans to use the Qattara Depression for the generation of electricity reportedly date back to 1912 from Berlin geographer Albrecht Penck.

Ball period 
The subject was first discussed in more detail by Dr. John Ball in 1927. Dr. Ball also made the first preliminary calculations on the achievable filling rate, inflow rate, electricity production and salinity.

Non-Egyptians seemed to be unaware of Qattara's existence until after the First World War. The credit for its "discovery" goes to Dr. John Ball, English director of the Survey of Egypt, who oversaw the mapping of the depression in 1927 and who first suggested using it to generate hydroelectricity.
In 1957 the American Central Intelligence Agency proposed to President Dwight Eisenhower that peace in the Middle East could be achieved by flooding the Qattara Depression. The resulting lagoon, according to the CIA, would have four benefits:

 It would be spectacular and peaceful.
 It would materially alter the climate in adjacent areas.
 It would provide work during construction and living areas after completion for the Palestinian Arabs.
 It would get Egyptian president Gamel Abdel Nasser's "mind on other matters" because "he need[ed] some way to get off the Soviet Hook."

Bassler period 

From 1964 onward Prof. Friedrich Bassler led  the international "Board of Advisers" which was responsible for planning and financing activities of the project. He also advised the Egyptian government on the matter from 1975 onward. He was appointed to make a first preliminary feasibility study by the German Federal Ministry of Economics in Bonn.

Bassler was the driving force behind the Qattara Project for nearly a decade. Half way through the seventies a team of eight mostly German scientists and technicians was working on the planning of the first hydro-solar depression power station in the world. The first "Bassler study" of 1973 laid the basis for the Egyptian government to commission a study of its own. It decided in 1975 that Bassler and a group of companies known as "Joint Venture Qattara" should conduct a feasibility study of the project.

The project concept was: Mediterranean water should be channeled through a canal or tunnel towards the Qattara Depression, which lies below sea level. This water would then fall into the depression through penstocks for electricity generation. The water would evaporate quickly because of the very dry and hot weather once in the depression. This would allow for more water to enter the depression and would create a continuous source of electricity.

A canal 60 meters deep would connect the Mediterranean with the depression's edge at this narrow isthmus. This canal would deliver water to the depression as well as being a shipping route towards the Qattara lake with a harbor and fishing grounds in the depression. The depression was to be filled to a height of 60 m below sea level. It would take a total of 10 years to fill to that level. After that the incoming flow would balance out against the outgoing evaporation and would cause the lake level to stop changing.

In the first phase of the project the Qattara 1 station was to generate 670 megawatts. The second phase was to generate an additional 1,200 megawatts. A pumped-storage hydroelectricity facility would increase the peak production capacity with another 4,000 megawatts, totaling about 5,800 megawatts.

The core problem of the project was the cost and technical difficulty of diverting seawater to the depression. Calculations showed that digging a canal or tunnel would be too expensive. Demining would be needed to remove some of the millions of unexploded ordnance left from World War II in Northern Egypt. Consequently, use of nuclear explosives to excavate the canal was another proposal by Bassler. This plan called for the detonation in boreholes of 213 nuclear devices, each yielding 1.5 megatons (i.e. 100 times that of the atomic bomb used against Hiroshima). This fit within the Atoms for Peace program proposed by President Dwight Eisenhower in 1953. Evacuation plans cited numbers of at least 25,000 evacuees. The shock waves from the explosion might also affect the tectonically unstable Red Sea Rift located just 450 km away from the blast site. Another danger was increased coast erosion because sea currents could change in such a way that even very remote coastal areas would erode. Because of the concerns about using a nuclear solution the Egyptian government turned down the plan, and the project's stakeholders gave up on the project.

Continued interest 
Since then, scientists and engineers still occasionally explore the viability of such a project, as a key to resolving economic, population, and ecological stresses in the area, but the project has yet to be undertaken.

See also 
 Arpa–Sevan tunnel
 Sahara Sea
 Salton Sea

References 

 M. A. Eizel-Din and M. B. Khalil.: "Egypt's Qattara Depression potential hydropower". – In: Proceedings of the international conference "Handshake across the Jordan – Water and Understanding in the Middle East". In: Forum Umwelttechnik und Wasserbau, Nr. 10. IUP – Innsbruck University Press, Innsbruck, 2011, pp. 89-96

Macro-engineering
Proposed energy infrastructure in Africa